Montgomery is a city in Le Sueur County, Minnesota, United States, 45 miles south of Minneapolis. It was named after Richard Montgomery, an Irish-American soldier who served as a major general in the Continental Army during the Revolutionary War. The population was 2,956 at the 2010 census.

History
Montgomery as platted in 1877 when the railroad was extended to that point. Martin M. Malone (1888-1962), politician and businessman, was born in Montgomery.

Education

Montgomery is a part of the Tri-City United School District, ISD #2905. The district includes a grades 9-12 high school in Montgomery; K-8 campuses in Montgomery and Le Center; and a K-4 elementary school in Lonsdale. The district's sports teams, the Titans, are members of the Minnesota River Conference, and participate in baseball, softball, basketball, cross-country, hockey, tennis, track, football, cheerleading, wrestling, golf and volleyball.

The academic performance of students exiting Tri-City United High School has been subject to concern from the community. With a slim majority of students (58%) graduating without achieving proficiency in Mathematics, and a substantial number of students graduating without achieving proficiency in Reading (53%). Graduates from the Tri-City United School District rarely go on to attend elite higher education institutions. The Tri-City United School District hosts a significant number of minority students (17%), and spends a significant amount of funding on ESL (English as a Second Language) programs.

The Most Holy Redeemer Catholic School is a parochial pre-K-8 school. Its sports teams, the Raiders, compete in the Tri-County Private School Conference in sports including volleyball, basketball, baseball and softball.

Arts and culture

Montgomery celebrates its Czechoslovakian heritage annually at the end of July with one of Minnesota's oldest festivals, Kolacky Days. The festival dates back to 1929, when an estimated 6,000 people visited Montgomery for the first Kolacky Day celebration, held on October 1.

"The Kolacky Day spirit reigned supreme from early Tuesday morning until a comparatively late hour Wednesday morning. More than 1,600 of the celebrated delicacies were devoured," according to a Montgomery Messenger account from the following week.

Events at the first celebration included a trap shooting tournament, a parade, sports and races, and a football game between Montgomery and Le Sueur Center (now Le Center).

In 1931 Miss Leatta Ehmke (later Leatta Trnka) was crowned the first Kolacky Queen by Mayor Henry Westerman. For the 1934 celebration, a novelty button, sold by the Kolacky girls, was devised and is still in use today. Following the attack on Pearl Harbor on December 7, 1941, Kolacky Day retreated to the background until the Montgomery Community Club revived the celebration in 1948. Kolacky Day officially became a summer festival in 1966 when the traditional date, the last Sunday in September, was dropped in favor of the first weekend in August. The earlier date and warmer weather brought huge crowds to the festival. In 1975, Kolacky Day became Kolacky Days and the event was held for the first time at the end of July. It is now celebrated on the fourth full weekend of that month. The shift was made at the urging of the Green Giant vegetable canning company, to avoid conflict with the busy corn-processing season.

Other annual events include the Torchlight Parade & Fireworks, the Masopust Festival also known as "The Czech Mardi Gras" and the Miss Czech-Slovak MN Pageant.

Parks and recreation

Baseball
Montgomery's baseball tradition includes the amateur baseball team, known as the Mallards, the former high school Montgomery-Lonsdale Redbirds and now the Tri-City United Titans.
The Mallards play in the Dakota Rice Scott Amateur Baseball League (DRS) under the direction of the Minnesota Baseball Association. The Mallards participated in the State Tournament in 1998, 1999, 2002, 2016 and 2022. They play their home games at Memorial Field, in Memorial Park.

The Redbirds played in the Minnesota River Conference under the direction of the Minnesota High School League.  The Redbirds participated in a few State Tournaments and won the Class A State Championship for the 1998-1999 Season.  Now the tradition continues with the consolidated Tri-City United School District.

Recreation
The Tri-City United Community Education Office provides the citizens of Montgomery as well as the rest of the school district with recreational opportunities for all ages.

City parks
Memorial Park
North Side
West Side
Veteran's Memorial Park

Nearby Lakes
 Lake Pepin
 Lake Dora
 Clear Lake
 Gorman Lake

Politics
Montgomery is in Minnesota's 2nd congressional district, represented by Angie Craig (DFL); Minnesota Senate district 22, represented by Rich Draheim (R); and Minnesota House district 22B, represented by Brian Pfarr (R).  In terms of county politics, Montgomery is a part of Le Sueur County District #2 and represented by Joe Connolly.

Media reference
Area resident Andrew Rogers finished in fifth place at the Poker Dome Challenge, a 43-week series of speed poker tournaments with a grand prize of $1,000,000.

Economy
Seneca Foods (formerly Green Giant) has a freezing and canning facility in Montgomery. United Steel Products also has a large facility in town. The economy of the Montgomery area relies heavily on agriculture, and other assorted blue collar jobs.

Geography

Minnesota State Highways 13 and 21 are two of the main routes in the city.

Minnesota State Highway 99 is located directly to the south.

Montgomery is 15 miles from Interstate 35.

The closest towns to Montgomery are:
 North - New Prague
 South - Kilkenny
 East - Lonsdale
 West - Le Center

The closest major city is Faribault to the Southeast.

Demographics

2010 census
At the 2010 census, there were 2,956 people, 1,185 households and 760 families residing in the city. The racial makeup of the city was 94.4% White, 0.2% African American, 0.6% Native American, 0.4% Asian, 2.3% from other races, and 2.0% from two or more races. Hispanic or Latino of any race were 6.4% of the population.

There were 1,185 households, of which 33.5% had children under the age of 18 living with them, 47.4% were married couples living together, 10.5% had a female householder with no husband present, 6.2% had a male householder with no wife present, and 35.9% were non-families. 30.3% of all households were made up of individuals, and 11.4% had someone living alone who was 65 years of age or older. The average household size was 2.49 and the average family size was 3.07.

The median age was 35.1 years. 27.3% of residents were under the age of 18; 6.8% were between the ages of 18 and 24; 28.5% were from 25 to 44; 23.9% were from 45 to 64; and 13.4% were 65 years of age or older. The population was 50.6% male and 49.4% female.

2000 census
At the 2000 census, there were 2,794 people, 1,105 households and 690 families residing in the city. The racial makeup of the city was 93.59% White, 0.32% African American, 0.25% Native American, 0.32% Asian, 4.29% from other races, and 1.22% from two or more races. Hispanic or Latino of any race were 9.77% of the population.

There were 1,105 households, of which 33.6% had children under the age of 18 living with them, 49.7% were married couples living together, 8.6% had a female householder with no husband present, and 37.5% were non-families. 32.8% of all households were made up of individuals, and 16.2% had someone living alone who was 65 years of age or older. The average household size was 2.52 and the average family size was 3.23.

28.7% of the population were under the age of 18, 9.4% from 18 to 24, 28.6% from 25 to 44, 19.3% from 45 to 64, and 14.0% who were 65 years of age or older. The median age was 34 years. For every 100 females, there were 98.7 males. For every 100 females age 18 and over, there were 98.5 males.

The median household income was $34,145 and the median family income was $48,011. Males had a median income of $30,707 compared with $23,977 for females. The per capita income was $16,128.  About 8.1% of families and 11.6% of the population were below the poverty line, including 13.6% of those under age 18 and 18.3% of those age 65 or over.

Climate

References

Further reading
 Montgomery: From the "Big Woods" To the "Kolacky Capital", second edition (2000), Montgomery Arts and Heritage Center.

External links
 Kolacky Days
 Montgomery MN Newspaper
 Kolacky Days on Facebook
 Big Honza's Museum of Unnatural History
 ePodunk entry for Montgomery
 Montgomery Chamber Of Commerce

Cities in Minnesota
Czech-American culture in Minnesota
Cities in Le Sueur County, Minnesota
1877 establishments in Minnesota
Slovak-American culture in Minnesota